Paul Khoury is an Lebanese-Australian television personality and voice talent.

Paul Khoury may also refer to:

Paul Khoury (rugby league), Lebanese rugby league international player
Paul Afeaki Khoury, Lebanese-Tongan basketball player
, Lebanese philosopher